Massimo Ciavarro (born 7 November 1957) is an Italian actor and television personality.

Life and career 
Born in Rome, Ciavarro started his career in 1972, as a fotoromanzi actor. He made his film debut in 1976, in the commedia sexy all'italiana Sorbola...che romagnola!, and was the star of a series of romantic comedy teen films in the first half of the 1980s. Since the 2000s he has focused his activities on television, appearing in TV series and on several reality shows, notably the sixth edition of L'Isola dei Famosi. He was married for several years to the actress Eleonora Giorgi.

References

External links 

1957 births
Male actors from Rome
Italian male stage actors
Italian male film actors
Italian male television actors
Living people
Participants in Italian reality television series
20th-century Italian male actors
21st-century Italian male actors